The Wangan (or Babbinburra) are an Aboriginal Australian people of the Isaac Region of Central Queensland.

Country
These extended northwards to the vicinity of Blair Athol, and eastwards as far as the Peak Ranges. Their westward extension went as far as Drummond Range. They were also present at Peak Downs.

Social divisions
One name at least survives for a clan of the Wangan, the Babbinburra, a horde that inhabited the area between Mistake Creek and Clermont. The element -burra was a suffix, meaning 'tribe, according to James Muirhead, who stated that the Babbinburra/Wangan were one of several tribes speaking the same language.

History of contact
In very recent developments the descendants of the Wangan together with those of the Jagalingou have been engaged in a legal battle with the Queensland and Federal governments over the approval of the development of the Carmichael coal mine, a project run by the Adani Group.

Alternative names
 Babbinburra

Selected vocabulary
 wanti (tame dog)
 aunti or woddi (father)
 yunga (mother)

Notes

Citations

Sources

Aboriginal peoples of Queensland